Kenta Treacher Hasebe (born 1991) is a Japanese international lawn and indoor bowler.

Biography
Hasebe, a school teacher by trade, represented Japan in the 2016 World Outdoor Bowls Championship in Christchurch and won a bronze medal in the triples with Hisaharu Satoh and Kenichi Emura. The bronze medal was the first ever bowls medal won by his nation.

World Championships
In 2020, he was selected for his second World Championship at the 2020 World Outdoor Bowls Championship in Australia.

Asia Pacific Championships
He won two medals at the 2015 Asia Pacific Bowls Championships in Christchurch.

References 

1991 births
Living people
Japanese male bowls players